Vaithianathan Venkatasubramanian is an electrical engineer at Washington State University in Pullman, Washington. He was named a Fellow of the Institute of Electrical and Electronics Engineers (IEEE) in 2015 for his contributions to online detection of oscillatory behavior of electric power systems.

References 

Fellow Members of the IEEE
Living people
Year of birth missing (living people)